Wertingen is a town in the district of Dillingen in Bavaria, Germany. It is located along the river Zusam in 13 km east of Dillingen, and 28 km northwest of Augsburg.  The city is the seat of the municipal association Wertingen.

See also
 Battle of Wertingen
 Gymnasium Wertingen

References

Dillingen (district)